The huge moth family Noctuidae contains the following genera:

A B C D E F G H I J K L M N O P Q R S T U V W X Y Z

Abagrotis
Ableptina
Ablita
Abolla
Abriesa
Abrostola
Abseudrapa
Acacallis
Acaenica
Acanthermia
Acanthodelta
Acanthodica
Acantholeucania
Acanthoplusia
Acanthopolia
Acanthoprora
Acantuerta
Acerra
Achaeops
Acharya
Achatia
Achatodes
Acherdoa
Achytonix
Acidaliodes
Acmana
Acontarache
Acontia
Acontiola
Acopa
Acosmetia
Acrapex
Acrarmostis
Acrobyla
Acronicta
Acropserotarache
Acroria
Acroriesis
Acroriodes
Acrosphalia
Actebia
Actinotia
Acutipenna
Acygnatha
Acygonia
Acylita
Adamphipyra
Adaphaenura
Adelphagrotis
Adeva
Adiopa
Adipsophanes
Adisura
Admetovis
Adoraria
Adpyramidcampa
Adra
Adrana (synonym of Paectes)
Adrapsa
Adrapsoides
Adris
Adrocampa
Adyroma
Aegara
Aegilia
Aegle
Aegleoides
Aegocera
Aegoceropsis
Aeologramma
Aethalina
Aethodes
Afotella
Afrenella
Afrogortyna
Agabra
Agamana
Aganopis
Aganzagara
Agape
Agarista
Agaristodes
Agassizia
Aggustiana
Aginna
Aglossestra
Aglossostola
Agnomonia
Agnorisma
Agoma
Agraga
Agrapha
Agriopodes
Agrochola
Agrolitha
Agronoma
Agroperina
Agrotana
Agrotimorpha
Agrotiphila
Agrotis
Agrotisia
Agrotontia
Agyra
Aingrapha
Airamia
Akoniodes
Akonus
Alamis
Alapadna
Alberticodes
Alelimma
Alelimminola
Aleptina
Aleptinoides
Aletia
Aletopus
Aleucanitis
Alibama
Alika
Alikangiana
Alimala
Alinobia
Alinza
Allagrapha
Allia
Allitoria
Alloasteropetes
Allophyes
Allorhodoecia
Alogonia
Alophosoma
Alotsa
Alpesa
Alpichola
Alpsotis
Altiplania
Altipolia
Aluaca
Alura
Alvaradoia
Alypia
Alypiodes
Alypophanes
Alysina
Amabela
Amarna
Amathes
Amazela
Amazonides
Amblygoes
Amblygonia
Amblyprora
Amefrontia
Amelina
Amephana
Ametropalpis
Amiana
Amilaga
Ammetopa
Ammoconia
Ammogrotis
Ammophanes
Ammopolia
Ampelasia
Amphia
Amphidrina
Amphigonia
Amphilita
Amphiongia
Amphipoea
Amphipyra
Amphitrogia
Amphitrota
Amphodia
Amphoraceras
Amyna
Amynodes
Anabathra
Anablemma
Anadevidia
Anagoa
Anagrapha
Analetia
Anamecia
Ananepa
Anapamea
Anaplectoides
Anaplusia
Anapoma
Anarta
Anartodes
Anartomima
Anartomorpha
Anatatha
Anateinoma
Anathetis
Anathix
Ancara
Ancarista
Anchiroe
Anchoscelis
Ancistris
Andesia
Andicola
Andobana
Andrewsia
Andrhippuris
Andrianam
Androdes
Androloma
Androlymnia
Andropolia
Aneda
Anedhella
Aneliopis
Anepilecta
Anepischetos
Anereuthina
Anereuthinula
Aneuviminia
Angulostiria
Anhausta
Anhimella
Aniana
Anicla
Anigraea
Anigraeopsis
Anisoneura
Anitha
Annaphila
Anoba
Anodontodes
Anomis
Anomocala
Anomogyna
Anomophlebia
Anophia
Anophiodes
Anoratha
Anorena
Anorthoa
Anorthodes
Anpyramida
Ansa
Antachara
Antapamea
Antapistis
Antaplaga
Antarchaea
Anterastria
Antha
Anthocitta
Anthodes
Antholopha
Anthracia
Antiamphipyra
Antiblemma
Anticarsia
Antichera
Antigodasa
Antiophlebia
Antipolia
Antirhyacia
Antitype
Antivaleria
Antoculeora
Anua
Anuga
Anugana
Anumeta
Anycteola
Anydrophila
Aon
Apaconjunctdonta
Apaegocera
Apamea
Apanda
Apaustis
Apharetra
Aphorisma
Aphypena
Apina
Apistis
Apladrapsa
Aplectoides
Aplocampa
Aplotelia
Apocalymnia
Apopestes
Aporophoba
Aporophyla
Apospasta
Apostema
Apoxestia
Appana
Apphadana
Apsaphida
Apsaranycta
Apsarasa
Apustis
Arabriga
Araea
Araeognatha
Araeopterella
Araeopteron
Aramuna
Arasada
Arattatha
Arbasera
Arboricornus
Arbostola
Archana
Archanara
Archanarta
Archephia
Arcilasisa
Arcte
Arctinia
Arctiopais
Arctomyscis
Arenarba
Arenostola
Aretypa
Argania
Argentostiria
Argidia
Argillana
Argillophora
Argiva
Argyphia
Argyrana
Argyrargenta
Argyrhoda
Argyritis
Argyrogalea
Argyrogramma
Argyrolepidia
Argyrolopha
Argyromata
Argyromatoides
Argyropasta
Argyrospila
Argyrosticta
Argyrostrotis
Ariathisa
Aridagricola
Ariphrades
Aristaria
Armada
Armana
Aroana
Arpia
Arrade
Arrothia
Arsacia
Arsaciodes
Arsilonche
Arsina
Arsisaca
Artena
Arthisma
Arthrochlora
Artigisa
Artiloxis
Arugisa
Arvaduca
Arytrura
Arytrurides
Arzama
Arzamopsis
Ascalapha
Asclepistola
Aseptis
Ashworthia
Asiccia
Asidemia
Asisyra
Asota
Aspidhampsonia
Aspidifrontia
Asplenia
Asta
Astephana
Asteropetes
Asteroscopus
Astha
Asthala
Asthana
Asticta
Astiotes
Astonycha
Asylaea
Asymbata
Asymbletia
Asyneda
Atacira
Ateneria
Atethmia
Athaumasta
Athetis
Athurmodes
Athyrma
Athyrmella
Athyrmina
Athysania
Atimaea
Atlantagrotis
Atopomorpha
Atrachea
Atrephes
Attatha
Attonda
Atypha
Aucha
Auchecranon
Auchenisa
Auchmis
Auchmophanes
Aucula
Audea
Aulocheta
Aulotarache
Aumakua
Aurxanthia
Ausava
Ausinza
Australothis
Austramathes
Austrandesia
Austrazenia
Authadistis
Autoba
Autographa
Autophila
Autoplusia
Avatha
Aventina
Aventiola
Avirostrum
Avitta
Avittonia
Axenus
Axiocteta
Axiorata
Axylia
Azatha
Azazia
Azenia
Azeta
Azirista
Azumaia

References 

 Natural History Museum Lepidoptera genus database

 
Noctuid genera A